The history of independent India began when the country became an independent nation within the British Commonwealth on 15 August 1947. Direct administration by the British, which began in 1858, affected a political and economic unification of the subcontinent. When British rule came to an end in 1947, the subcontinent was partitioned along religious lines into two separate countries—India, with a majority of Hindus, and Pakistan, with a majority of Muslims. Concurrently the Muslim-majority northwest and east of British India was separated into the Dominion of Pakistan, by the Partition of India. The partition led to a population transfer of more than 10 million people between India and Pakistan and the death of about one million people. Indian National Congress leader Jawaharlal Nehru became the first Prime Minister of India, but the leader most associated with the independence struggle, Mahatma Gandhi, accepted no office. The constitution adopted in 1950 made India a democratic country, and this democracy has been sustained since then. India's sustained democratic freedoms are unique among the world's newly independent states.

The nation has faced religious violence, naxalism, terrorism and regional separatist insurgencies. India has unresolved territorial disputes with China which escalated into a war in 1962 and 1967, and with Pakistan which resulted in wars in 1947, 1965, 1971 and 1999. India was neutral in the Cold War, and was a leader in the Non-Aligned Movement. However, it made a loose alliance with the Soviet Union from 1971, when Pakistan was allied with the United States and the People's Republic of China.

India is a nuclear-weapon state, having conducted its first nuclear test in 1974, followed by another five tests in 1998. From the 1950s to the 1980s, India followed socialist-inspired policies. The economy was influenced by extensive regulation, protectionism and public ownership, leading to pervasive corruption and slow economic growth. Beginning in 1991, economic liberalisation in India has transformed India into the third largest and one of the fastest-growing economies in the world despite following Dirigisme economic system.

From being a relatively struggling country in its formative years, the Republic of India has emerged as a fast growing G20 major economy. India has sometimes been referred to as a great power and a potential superpower given its large and growing economy, military and population.

1947–1950: Dominion of India

Independent India's first years were marked with turbulent events—a massive exchange of population with Pakistan, the Indo-Pakistani War of 1947 and the integration of over 500 princely states to form a united nation. Vallabhbhai Patel, Jawaharlal Nehru and Mahatma Gandhi also ensured that the constitution of independent India would be secular.

Partition of India

An estimated 3.5 million Hindus and Sikhs living in West Punjab, North-West Frontier Province, Baluchistan, East Bengal and Sind migrated to India in fear of domination and suppression in Muslim Pakistan. Communal violence killed an estimated one million Hindus, Muslims and Sikhs, and gravely destabilised both dominions along their Punjab and Bengal boundaries, and the cities of Calcutta, Delhi and Lahore. The violence was stopped by early September owing to the co-operative efforts of both Indian and Pakistani leaders, and especially due to the efforts of Mohandas Gandhi, the leader of the Indian freedom struggle, who undertook a fast-unto-death in Calcutta and later in Delhi to calm people and emphasise peace despite the threat to his life. Both governments constructed large relief camps for incoming and leaving refugees, and the Indian Army was mobilised to provide humanitarian assistance on a massive scale.

The assassination of Mohandas Gandhi on 30 January 1948 was carried out by Nathuram Godse, who held him responsible for partition and charged that Mohandas Gandhi was appeasing Muslims. More than one million people flooded the streets of Delhi to follow the procession to cremation grounds and pay their last respects.

In 1949, India recorded almost 1 million Hindu refugees into West Bengal and other states from East Pakistan, owing to communal violence, intimidation, and repression from Muslim authorities. The plight of the refugees outraged Hindus and Indian nationalists, and the refugee population drained the resources of Indian states, who were unable to absorb them. While not ruling out war, Prime Minister Nehru and Sardar Patel invited Liaquat Ali Khan for talks in Delhi. Although many Indians termed this appeasement, Nehru signed a pact with Liaquat Ali Khan that pledged both nations to the protection of minorities and creation of minority commissions. Although opposed to the principle, Patel decided to back this pact for the sake of peace, and played a critical role in garnering support from West Bengal and across India, and enforcing the provisions of the pact. Khan and Nehru also signed a trade agreement, and committed to resolving bilateral disputes through peaceful means. Steadily, hundreds of thousands of Hindus returned to East Pakistan, but the thaw in relations did not last long, primarily owing to the Kashmir dispute.

Integration of princely states

In July 1946, Jawaharlal Nehru pointedly observed that no princely state could prevail militarily against the army of independent India. In January 1947, Nehru said that independent India would not accept the divine right of kings. In May 1947, he declared that any princely state which refused to join the Constituent Assembly would be treated as an enemy state. British India consisted of 17 provinces, which existed alongside 565 princely states. The provinces were given to India or Pakistan, in two particular cases—Punjab and Bengal—after being partitioned. The princes of the princely states, however, were given the right to either remain independent or accede to either dominion. Thus India's leaders were faced with the prospect of inheriting a fragmented nation with independent states and kingdoms dispersed across the mainland. Under the leadership of Sardar Vallabhbhai Patel, the new Government of India employed political negotiations backed with the option (and, on several occasions, the use) of military action to ensure the primacy of the central government and of the Constitution then being drafted. Sardar Patel and V. P. Menon convinced the rulers of princely states contiguous to India to accede to India. Many rights and privileges of the rulers of the princely states, especially their personal estates and privy purses, were guaranteed to convince them to accede. Some of them were made Rajpramukh (governor) and Uprajpramukh (deputy governor) of the merged states. Many small princely states were merged to form viable administrative states such as Saurashra, PEPSU, Vindhya Pradesh and Madhya Bharat. Some princely states such as Tripura and Manipur acceded later in 1949.

There were three states that proved more difficult to integrate than others:
 Junagadh (Hindu-majority state with a Muslim Nawab)—a December 1947 plebiscite resulted in a 99% vote to merge with India, annulling the controversial accession to Pakistan, which was made by the Nawab against the wishes of the people of the state who were overwhelmingly Hindu and despite Junagadh not being contiguous with Pakistan.
 Hyderabad (Hindu-majority state with a Muslim nizam)—Patel ordered the Indian army to depose the government of the Nizam, code-named Operation Polo, after the failure of negotiations, which was done between 13 and 29 September 1948. It was incorporated as a state of India the next year.
 The state of Jammu and Kashmir (a Muslim-majority state with a Hindu king) in the far north of the subcontinent quickly became a source of controversy that erupted into the First Indo-Pakistani War which lasted from 1947 to 1949. Eventually, a United Nations-overseen ceasefire was agreed that left India in control of two-thirds of the contested region. Jawaharlal Nehru initially agreed to Mountbatten's proposal that a plebiscite be held in the entire state as soon as hostilities ceased, and a UN-sponsored cease-fire was agreed to by both parties on 1 January 1949. No statewide plebiscite was held, however, for in 1954, after Pakistan began to receive arms from the United States, Nehru withdrew his support. The Indian Constitution came into force in Kashmir on 26 January 1950 with special clauses for the state.

Constitution

The Constitution of India was adopted by the Constituent Assembly on 26 November 1949 and became effective on 26 January 1950. The constitution replaced the Government of India Act 1935 as the country's fundamental governing document, and the Dominion of India became the Republic of India. To ensure constitutional autochthony, its framers repealed prior acts of the British parliament in Article 395. India celebrates its constitution on 26 January as Republic Day.

The constitution declares India a sovereign, socialist, secular, and democratic republic, assures its citizens justice, equality, and liberty, and endeavours to promote fraternity.

Indo-Pakistani War of 1947–1948

The Indo-Pakistani War of 1947–1948 was fought between India and Pakistan over the princely state of Kashmir and Jammu from 1947 to 1948. It was the first of four Indo-Pakistan Wars fought between the two newly independent nations. Pakistan precipitated the war a few weeks after independence by launching tribal lashkar (militia) from Waziristan, in an effort to secure Kashmir, the future of which hung in the balance. A  United Nations-mediated ceasefire took place in 5 January 1949.

Indian losses in the war totalled 1,104 killed and 3,154 wounded; Pakistani, about 6,000 killed and 14,000 wounded.
Neutral assessments state India emerged victorious as it successfully defended the majority of the contested territory.

1950s and 1960s

India held its first national elections under the Constitution in 1952, where a turnout of over 60% was recorded. The National Congress Party won an overwhelming majority, and Jawaharlal Nehru began a second term as Prime Minister. President Prasad was also elected to a second term by the electoral college of the first Parliament of India.

Nehru administration (1952–1964)
Prime Minister Nehru led the Congress to major election victories in 1957 and 1962. The Parliament passed extensive reforms that increased the legal rights of women in Hindu society, and further legislated against caste discrimination and untouchability. Nehru advocated a strong initiative to enroll India's children to complete primary education, and thousands of schools, colleges and institutions of advanced learning, such as the Indian Institutes of Technology, were founded across the nation. Nehru advocated a socialist model for the economy of India—Five-Year Plans were shaped by the Soviet model based on centralised and integrated national economic programs—no taxation for Indian farmers, minimum wage and benefits for blue-collar workers, and the nationalisation of heavy industries such as steel, aviation, shipping, electricity, and mining. Village common lands were seized, and an extensive public works and industrialisation campaign resulted in the construction of major dams, irrigation canals, roads, thermal and hydroelectric power stations, and many more.

States reorganisation

Potti Sreeramulu's fast-unto-death, and consequent death for the demand of an Andhra State in 1952 sparked a major re-shaping of the Indian Union. Nehru appointed the States Re-organisation Commission, upon whose recommendations the States Reorganisation Act was passed in 1956. Old states were dissolved and new states created on the lines of shared linguistic and ethnic demographics. The separation of Kerala and the Telugu-speaking regions of Madras State enabled the creation of an exclusively Tamil-speaking state of Tamil Nadu. On 1 May 1960, the states of Maharashtra and Gujarat were created out of the bilingual Bombay State, and on 1 November 1966, the larger Punjab state was divided into the smaller, Punjabi-speaking Punjab and Haryanvi-speaking Haryana states.

C. Rajagopalachari and formation of Swatantra Party

On 4 June 1959, shortly after the Nagpur session of the Indian National Congress, C. Rajagopalachari, along with Murari Vaidya of the newly established Forum of Free Enterprise (FFE) and Minoo Masani, a classical liberal and critic of socialist Nehru, announced the formation of the new Swatantra Party at a meeting in Madras. Conceived by disgruntled heads of former princely states such as the Raja of Ramgarh, the Maharaja of Kalahandi and the Maharajadhiraja of Darbhanga, the party was conservative in character. Later, N. G. Ranga, K. M. Munshi, Field Marshal K. M. Cariappa and the Maharaja of Patiala joined the effort. Rajagopalachari, Masani and Ranga also tried but failed to involve Jayaprakash Narayan in the initiative.

In his short essay "Our Democracy", Rajagopalachari argued the necessity of a right-wing alternative to the Congress:  "since ... the Congress Party has swung to the Left, what is wanted is not an ultra or outer-Left [viz. the CPI or the Praja Socialist Party, PSP], but a strong and articulate Right." Rajagopalachari also said the opposition must: "operate not privately and behind the closed doors of the party meeting, but openly and periodically through the electorate." He outlined the goals of the Swatantra Party through twenty-one "fundamental principles" in the foundation document. The party stood for equality and opposed government control over the private sector. Rajagopalachari sharply criticised the bureaucracy and coined the term "licence-permit Raj" to describe Nehru's elaborate system of permissions and licences required for an individual to set up a private enterprise. Rajagopalachari's personality became a rallying point for the party.

Rajagopalachari's efforts to build an anti-Congress front led to a patch-up with his former adversary C. N. Annadurai of the Dravida Munnetra Kazhagam. During the late 1950s and early 1960s, Annadurai grew close to Rajagopalachari and sought an alliance with the Swatantra Party for the 1962 Madras Legislative Assembly elections. Although there were occasional electoral pacts between the Swatantra Party and the Dravida Munnetra Kazhagam (DMK), Rajagopalachari remained non-committal on a formal tie-up with the DMK due to its existing alliance with Communists whom he dreaded. The Swatantra Party contested 94 seats in the Madras state assembly elections and won six as well as won 18 parliamentary seats in the 1962 Lok Sabha elections.

Foreign policy and military conflicts

Nehru's foreign policy was the inspiration of the Non-Aligned Movement, of which India was a co-founder. Nehru maintained friendly relations with both the United States and the Soviet Union, and encouraged the People's Republic of China to join the global community of nations. In 1956, when the Suez Canal Company was seized by the Egyptian government, an international conference voted 18–4 to take action against Egypt. India was one of the four backers of Egypt, along with Indonesia, Sri Lanka, and the USSR. India had opposed the partition of Palestine and the 1956 invasion of the Sinai by Israel, the United Kingdom and France, but did not oppose the Chinese direct control over Tibet, and the suppression of a pro-democracy movement in Hungary by the Soviet Union. Although Nehru disavowed nuclear ambitions for India, Canada and France aided India in the development of nuclear power stations for electricity. India also negotiated an agreement in 1960 with Pakistan on the just use of the waters of seven rivers shared by the countries. Nehru had visited Pakistan in 1953, but owing to political turmoil in Pakistan, no headway was made on the Kashmir dispute.

India has fought a total of four wars/military conflicts with its rival nation Pakistan, two in this period. In the Indo-Pakistani War of 1947, fought over the disputed territory of Kashmir, Pakistan captured one-third of Kashmir (which India claims as its territory), and India captured three-fifths (which Pakistan claims as its territory). In the Indo-Pakistani War of 1965, India attacked Pakistan on all fronts by crossing the international border after attempts by Pakistani troops to infiltrate Indian-controlled Kashmir by crossing the de facto border between India and Pakistan in Kashmir.

In 1961, after continual petitions for a peaceful handover, India invaded and annexed the Portuguese colony of Goa on the west coast of India.

In 1962 China and India engaged in the brief Sino-Indian War over the border in the Himalayas. The war was a complete rout for the Indians and led to a refocusing on arms build-up and an improvement in relations with the United States. China withdrew from disputed territory in the contested Chinese South Tibet and Indian North-East Frontier Agency that it crossed during the war. India disputes China's sovereignty over the smaller Aksai Chin territory that it controls on the western part of the Sino-Indian border.

Post-Nehru India

Jawaharlal Nehru died on 27 May 1964, and Lal Bahadur Shastri succeeded him as Prime Minister. In 1965, India and Pakistan again went to war over Kashmir, but without any definitive outcome or alteration of the Kashmir boundary. The Tashkent Agreement was signed under the mediation of the Soviet government, but Shastri died on the night after the signing ceremony. A leadership election resulted in the elevation of Indira Gandhi, Nehru's daughter who had been serving as Minister for Information and Broadcasting, as the third Prime Minister. She defeated right-wing leader Morarji Desai. The Congress Party won a reduced majority in the 1967 elections owing to widespread disenchantment over rising prices of commodities, unemployment, economic stagnation, and food crisis. Indira Gandhi had started on a rocky note after agreeing to a devaluation of the rupee, which created much hardship for Indian businesses and consumers, and the import of wheat from the United States fell through due to political disputes.

In 1967, India and China again engaged with each other in Sino-Indian War of 1967 after the PLA soldiers opened fire on the Indian soldiers who were making a fence on the border in Nathu La. The Indian forces successfully repelled Chinese forces and the outcome saw Chinese defeat with their withdrawal from Sikkim.

Morarji Desai entered Gandhi's government as Deputy Prime Minister and Finance Minister, and with senior Congress politicians attempted to constrain Gandhi's authority. But following the counsel of her political advisor P. N. Haksar, Gandhi resuscitated her popular appeal by a major shift towards socialist policies. She successfully ended the Privy Purse guarantee for former Indian royalty, and waged a major offensive against party hierarchy over the nationalisation of India's banks. Although resisted by Desai and India's business community, the policy was popular with the masses. When Congress politicians attempted to oust Gandhi by suspending her Congress membership, Gandhi was empowered with a large exodus of members of parliament to her own Congress (R). The bastion of the Indian freedom struggle, the Indian National Congress, had split in 1969. Gandhi continued to govern with a slim majority.

1970s

In 1971, Indira Gandhi and her Congress (R) were returned to power with a massively increased majority. The nationalisation of banks was carried out, and many other socialist economic and industrial policies enacted. India intervened in the Bangladesh War of Independence, a civil war taking place in Pakistan's Bengali half, after millions of refugees had fled the persecution of the Pakistani army. The clash resulted in the independence of East Pakistan, which became known as Bangladesh, and Prime Minister Indira Gandhi's elevation to immense popularity. Relations with the United States grew strained, and India signed a 20-year treaty of friendship with the Soviet Union—breaking explicitly for the first time from non-alignment. In 1974, India tested its first nuclear weapon in the desert of Rajasthan, near Pokhran.

Annexation of Sikkim

In 1973, anti-royalist riots took place in the Kingdom of Sikkim. In 1975, the Prime Minister of Sikkim appealed to the Indian Parliament for Sikkim to become a state of India. In April of that year, the Indian Army took over the city of Gangtok and disarmed the Chogyal's palace guards. Thereafter, a referendum was held in which 97.5 percent of voters supported abolishing the monarchy, effectively approving union with India.

India is said to have stationed 20,000–40,000 troops in a country of only 200,000 during the referendum. On 16 May 1975, Sikkim became the 22nd state of the Indian Union, and the monarchy was abolished. To enable the incorporation of the new state, the Indian Parliament amended the Indian Constitution. First, the 35th Amendment laid down a set of conditions that made Sikkim an "Associate State", a special designation not used by any other state. A month later, the 36th Amendment repealed the 35th Amendment, and made Sikkim a full state, adding its name to the First Schedule of the Constitution.

Formation of Northeastern states

In the Northeast India, the state of Assam was divided into several states beginning in 1970 within the borders of what was then Assam. In 1963, the Naga Hills district became the 16th state of India under the name of Nagaland. Part of Tuensang was added to Nagaland. In 1970, in response to the demands of the Khasi, Jaintia and Garo people of the Meghalaya Plateau, the districts embracing the Khasi Hills, Jaintia Hills, and Garo Hills were formed into an autonomous state within Assam; in 1972 this became a separate state under the name of Meghalaya. In 1972, Arunachal Pradesh (the North-East Frontier Agency) and Mizoram (from the Mizo Hills in the south) were separated from Assam as union territories; both became states in 1986.

Green revolution and Operation Flood

India's population passed the 500 million mark in the early 1970s, but its long-standing food crisis was resolved with greatly improved agricultural productivity due to the Green Revolution. The government sponsored modern agricultural implements, new varieties of generic seeds, and increased financial assistance to farmers that increased the yield of food crops such as wheat, rice and corn, as well as commercial crops like cotton, tea, tobacco and coffee. Increased agricultural productivity expanded across the states of the Indo-Gangetic Plain and the Punjab.

Under Operation Flood, the government encouraged the production of milk, which increased greatly, and improved rearing of livestock across India. This enabled India to become self-sufficient in feeding its own population, ending two decades of food imports.

Indo-Pakistan War of 1971

The Indo-Pakistani War of 1971 was the third in four wars fought between the two nations. In this war, fought over the issue of self-rule in East Pakistan, India decisively defeated Pakistan, resulting in the creation of Bangladesh.

Indian Emergency

Economic and social problems, as well as allegations of corruption, caused increasing political unrest across India, culminating in the Bihar Movement. In 1974, the Allahabad High Court found Indira Gandhi guilty of misusing government machinery for election purposes. Opposition parties conducted nationwide strikes and protests demanding her immediate resignation. Various political parties united under Jaya Prakash Narayan to resist what he termed Gandhi's dictatorship. Leading strikes across India that paralysed its economy and administration, Narayan even called for the Army to oust Gandhi. In 1975, Gandhi advised President Fakhruddin Ali Ahmed to declare a state of emergency under the constitution, which allowed the central government to assume sweeping powers to defend law and order in the nation. Explaining the breakdown of law and order and threat to national security as her primary reasons, Gandhi suspended many civil liberties and postponed elections at national and state levels. Non-Congress governments in Indian states were dismissed, and nearly 1,000 opposition political leaders and activists were imprisoned and a programme of compulsory birth control introduced. Strikes and public protests were outlawed in all forms.

India's economy benefited from an end to paralysing strikes and political disorder. India announced a 20-point programme which enhanced agricultural and industrial production, increasing national growth, productivity, and job growth. But many organs of government and many Congress politicians were accused of corruption and authoritarian conduct. Police officers were accused of arresting and torturing innocent people. Indira's son and political advisor, Sanjay Gandhi, was accused of committing gross excesses—Sanjay was blamed for the Health Ministry carrying out forced vasectomies of men and sterilisation of women as a part of the initiative to control population growth, and for the demolition of slums in Delhi near the Turkmen Gate, which left thousands of people dead and many more displaced.

Janata interlude

Indira Gandhi's Congress Party called for general elections in 1977, only to suffer a humiliating electoral defeat at the hands of the Janata Party, an amalgamation of opposition parties. Morarji Desai became the first non-Congress Prime Minister of India. The Desai administration established tribunals to investigate Emergency-era abuses, and Indira and Sanjay Gandhi were arrested after a report from the Shah Commission.

In 1979, the coalition crumbled and Charan Singh formed an interim government. The Janata Party had become intensely unpopular due to its internecine warfare, and a perceived lack of leadership on solving India's serious economic and social problems.

1980s

Indira Gandhi and her Congress Party splinter group, the Indian National Congress or simply "Congress(I)", were swept back into power with a large majority in January 1980.

But the rise of an insurgency in Punjab would jeopardise India's security. In Assam, there were many incidents of communal violence between native villagers and refugees from Bangladesh, as well as settlers from other parts of India. When Indian forces, undertaking Operation Blue Star, raided the hideout of self-rule pressing Khalistan militants in the Golden Temple — Sikhs’ most holy shrine – in Amritsar, the inadvertent deaths of civilians and damage to the temple building inflamed tensions in the Sikh community across India. The Government used intensive police operations to crush militant operations, but it resulted in many claims of abuse of civil liberties. Northeast India was paralysed owing to the ULFA's clash with Government forces.

On 31 October 1984, the Prime Minister's own Sikh bodyguards assassinated her, and 1984 anti-Sikh riots erupted in Delhi and parts of Punjab, causing the deaths of thousands of Sikhs along with terrible pillage, arson, and rape. Senior members of the Congress Party have been implicated in stirring the violence against Sikhs. Government investigation has failed to date to discover the causes and punish the perpetrators, but public opinion blamed Congress leaders for directing attacks on Sikhs in Delhi.

Rajiv Gandhi administration

The Congress party chose Rajiv Gandhi, Indira's older son, as the next Prime Minister. Rajiv had been elected to Parliament only in 1982, and at 40, was the youngest national political leader and Prime Minister ever. But his youth and inexperience were an asset in the eyes of citizens tired of the inefficacy and corruption of career politicians, and looking for newer policies and a fresh start to resolve the country's long-standing problems. The Parliament was dissolved, and Rajiv led the Congress party to its largest majority in history (over 415 seats out of 545 possible), reaping a sympathy vote over his mother's assassination.

Rajiv Gandhi initiated a series of reforms: the Licence Raj was loosened, and government restrictions on foreign currency, travel, foreign investment, and imports decreased considerably. This allowed private businesses to use resources and produce commercial goods without government bureaucracy interfering, and the influx of foreign investment increased India's national reserves. As Prime Minister, Rajiv broke from his mother's precedent to improve relations with the United States, which increased economic aid and scientific co-operation. Rajiv's encouragement of science and technology resulted in a major expansion of the telecommunications industry and India's space programme, and gave birth to the software industry and information technology sector.

In December 1984, gas leaked out at the Union Carbide pesticides plant in the central Indian city of Bhopal. Thousands were killed immediately, while many more subsequently died or were left disabled.

India in 1987 brokered an agreement with the Government of Sri Lanka and agreed to deploy troops for peacekeeping operation in Sri Lanka's ethnic conflict led by the LTTE. Rajiv sent Indian troops to enforce the agreement and disarm the Tamil rebels, but the Indian Peace Keeping Force, as it was known, became entangled in outbreaks of violence, ultimately ending up fighting the Tamil rebels itself, and becoming a target of attack from Sri Lankan nationalists. V. P. Singh withdrew the IPKF in 1990, but thousands of Indian soldiers had died. Rajiv's departure from Socialist policies did not sit well with the masses, who did not benefit from the innovations. Unemployment was a serious problem, and India's burgeoning population added ever-increasing needs for diminishing resources.

Rajiv Gandhi's image as an honest politician (he was nicknamed "Mr. Clean" by the press) was shattered when the Bofors scandal broke, revealing that senior government officials had taken bribes over defence contracts by a Swedish guns producer.

Janata Dal
General elections in 1989 gave Rajiv's Congress a plurality, much less than the majority which propelled him to power.

Power came instead to his former finance and defence minister, VP Singh of Janata Dal. Singh had been moved from the Finance ministry to the Defence ministry after he unearthed some scandals which made the Congress leadership uncomfortable. Singh then unearthed the Bofors scandal, and was sacked from the party and office. Becoming a popular crusader for reform and clean government, Singh led the Janata Dal coalition to a majority. He was supported by BJP and the leftist parties from outside. Becoming Prime Minister, Singh made an important visit to the Golden Temple shrine, to heal the wounds of the past. He implemented the Mandal Commission report, to increase the quota in reservation for low-caste Hindus. His government fell after Singh, along with Bihar's Chief Minister Lalu Prasad Yadav's government, had Advani arrested in Samastipur and stopped his Ram Rath Yatra, which was going to the Babri Masjid site in Ayodhya on 23 October 1990. Bharatiya Janata Party withdrew their support to Singh government, causing them to lose parliamentary vote of confidence on 7 November 1990. Chandra Shekhar split to form the Janata Dal (Socialist), supported by Rajiv's Congress. This new government also collapsed in a matter of months, when Congress withdrew its support.

1990s

The then-Chief Minister of Jammu and Kashmir Farooq Abdullah (son of former Chief Minister Sheikh Abdullah) announced an alliance with the ruling Congress party for the elections of 1987. But, the elections were allegedly rigged in favour of him. This led to the rise of the armed extremist insurgency in Jammu and Kashmir composed, in part, of those who unfairly lost elections. India has constantly maintained the position of blaming Pakistan for supplying these groups with logistical support, arms, recruits and training.

Militants in Kashmir reportedly tortured and killed local Kashmiri Pandits, forcing them to leave Kashmir in large numbers. Around 90% of the Kashmiri Pandits left Kashmir during the 1990s, resulting in the ethnic cleansing of Kashmiri Hindus.

On 21 May 1991, while former Prime Minister Rajiv Gandhi campaigned in Tamil Nadu on behalf of Congress (Indira), a Liberation Tigers of Tamil Eelam (LTTE) female suicide bomber assassinated him and many others by setting off the bomb in her belt by leaning forward while garlanding him. In the elections, Congress (Indira) won 244 parliamentary seats and put together a coalition, returning to power under the leadership of P.V. Narasimha Rao. This Congress-led government, which served a full five-year term, initiated a gradual process of economic liberalisation and reform, which has opened the Indian economy to global trade and investment. India's domestic politics also took new shape, as traditional alignments by caste, creed, and ethnicity gave way to a plethora of small, regionally-based political parties.

But India was rocked by communal violence (see Bombay riots) between Hindus and Muslims that killed over 10,000 people, following the Babri Mosque demolition by Hindu extremists in the course of the Ram Janmabhoomi dispute in Ayodhya in December 1992. The final months of the Rao-led government in the spring of 1996 suffered the effects of several major political corruption scandals, which contributed to the worst electoral performance by the Congress Party in its history as the Hindu nationalist Bharatiya Janata Party emerged as the largest single party.

Economic reforms

Under the policies initiated by late Prime Minister P. V. Narasimha Rao and his then-Finance Minister Dr. Manmohan Singh, India's economy expanded rapidly. The economic reforms were a reaction to an impending balance of payment crisis. The Rao administration initiated the privatisation of large, inefficient, and loss-inducing government corporations. The UF government had attempted a progressive budget that encouraged reforms, but the 1997 Asian financial crisis and political instability created economic stagnation. The Vajpayee administration continued with privatisation, reduction of taxes, a sound fiscal policy aimed at reducing deficits and debts, and increased initiatives for public works. Cities like Bangalore, Hyderabad, Pune, and Ahmedabad have risen in prominence and economic importance, becoming centres of rising industries and destinations for foreign investment and firms. Strategies like forming Special Economic Zones—tax amenities, good communications infrastructure, low regulation—to encourage industries has paid off in many parts of the country.

A rising generation of well-educated and skilled professionals in scientific sectors of the industry began propelling the Indian economy, as the information technology industry took hold across India with the proliferation of computers. The new technologies increased the efficiency of activity in almost every type of industry, which also benefitted from the availability of skilled labor. Foreign investment and outsourcing of jobs to India's labor markets further enhanced India's economic growth. A large middle class has arisen across India, which has increased the demand, and thus the production of a wide array of consumer goods. Unemployment is steadily declining, and poverty has fallen to approximately 22%. Gross Domestic Product growth increased to beyond 7%. While serious challenges remain, India is enjoying a period of economic expansion that has propelled it to the forefront of the world economy, and has correspondingly increased its influence in political and diplomatic terms.

Era of coalitions

The Bharatiya Janata Party (BJP) emerged from the May 1996 national elections as the single-largest party in the Lok Sabha but without enough strength to prove a majority on the floor of that Parliament. Under Prime Minister Atal Bihari Vajpayee, the BJP coalition lasted in power 13 days. With all political parties wishing to avoid another round of elections, a 14-party coalition led by the Janata Dal emerged to form a government known as the United Front. A United Front government under former Chief Minister of Karnataka H. D. Deve Gowda lasted less than a year. The leader of the Congress Party withdrew support in March 1997. Inder Kumar Gujral replaced Deve Gowda as the consensus choice for Prime Minister of a 16-party United Front coalition.

In November 1997, the Congress Party again withdrew support for the United Front. New elections in February 1998 brought the BJP the largest number of seats in Parliament (182), but this fell far short of a majority. On 20 March 1998, the President inaugurated a BJP-led coalition government, with Vajpayee again serving as Prime Minister. On 11 and 13 May 1998, this government conducted a series of five underground nuclear weapons tests, known collectively as Pokhran-II — which caused Pakistan to conduct its own tests that same year. India's nuclear tests prompted President of the United States Bill Clinton and Japan to impose economic sanctions on India pursuant to the 1994 Nuclear Proliferation Prevention Act and led to widespread international condemnation.

In the early months of 1999, Prime Minister Vajpayee made a historic bus trip to Pakistan and met with Pakistan's Prime Minister Nawaz Sharif, signing the bilateral Lahore peace declaration.

In April 1999, the coalition government led by the Bharatiya Janata Party (BJP) fell apart, leading to fresh elections in September. In May and June 1999, India discovered an elaborate campaign of terrorist infiltration that resulted in the Kargil War in Kashmir, derailing a promising peace process that had begun only three months earlier when Prime Minister Vajpayee visited Pakistan, inaugurating the Delhi-Lahore bus service. Indian forces killed Pakistan-backed infiltrators and reclaimed important border posts in high-altitude warfare.

Soaring on popularity earned following the successful conclusion of the Kargil conflict, the National Democratic Alliance—a new coalition led by the BJP—gained a majority to form a government with Vajpayee as Prime Minister in October 1999. The end of the millennium was devastating to India, as a cyclone hit Orissa, killing at least 10,000.

2000s

Under Bharatiya Janata Party

In May 2000, India's population exceeded 1 billion. President of the United States Bill Clinton made a groundbreaking visit to India to improve ties between the two nations. In January, massive earthquakes hit Gujarat state, killing at least 30,000.

Prime Minister Vajpayee met with Pakistan's President Pervez Musharraf in the first summit between Pakistan and India in more than two years in the middle of 2001. But the meeting failed without a breakthrough or even a joint statement because of differences over Kashmir region.

Three new states — Chhattisgarh, Jharkhand and Uttarakhand (originally Uttaranchal) — were formed in November 2000.

The National Democratic Alliance government's credibility was adversely affected by a number of political scandals (such as allegations that the Defence Minister George Fernandes took bribes) as well as reports of intelligence failures that led to the Kargil incursions going undetected, and the apparent failure of his talks with the Pakistani President. Following the September 11 attacks, the United States lifted sanctions which it had imposed against India and Pakistan in 1998. The move was seen as a reward for their support for the War on Terror. The tensions of an imminent war between India and Pakistan again rose by the heavy Indian firing on Pakistani military posts along the Line of Control and the subsequent deadly Indian Parliament attack and the 2001–02 India–Pakistan standoff.

In 2002, 59 Hindu pilgrims returning from Ayodhya were killed in a train fire in Godhra, Gujarat. This sparked off the 2002 Gujarat riots, leading to the deaths of 790 Muslims and 254 Hindus and with 223 people reported missing.

Throughout 2003, India's speedy economic progress, political stability, and a rejuvenated peace initiative with Pakistan increased the government's popularity. India and Pakistan agreed to resume direct air links and to allow overflights, and a groundbreaking meeting was held between the Indian government and moderate Kashmir separatists. The Golden Quadrilateral project aimed to link India's corners with a network of modern highways.

Congress rule returns
In January 2004 Prime Minister Vajpayee recommended early dissolution of the Lok Sabha and general elections. an alliance led by the Congress Party called United Progressive Alliance(UPA) won a surprise victory in elections held in May 2004. Manmohan Singh became the Prime Minister, after the Congress President Sonia Gandhi, the widow of former Prime Minister Rajiv Gandhi, declined to take the office, to defuse the controversy about whether her foreign birth should be considered a disqualification for the Prime Minister's post. Apart from the Congress party, other members of UPA included Socialist and regional parties.The alliance had outside support of India's Communist parties. Manmohan Singh became the first Sikh and non-Hindu to hold India's most powerful office. Singh continued economic liberalisation, although the need for support from Indian Socialists and Communists forestalled further privatisation for some time.

By the end of 2004, India began to withdraw some of its troops from Kashmir. By the middle of the next year, the Srinagar–Muzaffarabad Bus service was inaugurated, the first in 60 years to operate between Indian-administered and Pakistani-administered Kashmirs. However, in May 2006, suspected Islamic extremist militants killed 35 Hindus in the worst attacks in Indian-administered Kashmir for several months.

The 2004 Indian Ocean earthquake and tsunami devastated Indian coastlines and islands, killing an estimated 18,000 and displacing around 650,000. The tsunami was caused by a powerful undersea earthquake off the Indonesian coast. Natural disasters such as the Mumbai floods (killing more than 1,000) and Kashmir earthquake (killing 79,000) hit the subcontinent in the next year. In February 2006, the United Progressive Alliance government launched India's largest-ever rural jobs scheme, aimed at lifting around 60 million families out of poverty.

The United States and India signed a major nuclear co-operation agreement during a visit by United States President George W. Bush in March 2006. According to the nuclear deal, the United States was to give India access to civilian nuclear technology while India agreed to greater scrutiny for its nuclear programme. Later, United States approved a controversial law allowing India to buy their nuclear reactors and fuel for the first time in 30 years. In July 2008, the United Progressive Alliance survived a vote of confidence brought after left-wing parties withdrew their support over the nuclear deal. After the vote, several left-wing and regional parties formed a new alliance to oppose the government, saying it had been tainted by corruption. Within three months, following approval by the U.S. Congress, George W. Bush signed into law a nuclear deal with India, which ended a three-decade ban on American nuclear trade with Delhi.

In 2007, India got its first female President as Pratibha Patil was sworn in. Long associated with the Nehru–Gandhi family, Pratibha Patil was a low-profile governor of the state of Rajasthan before emerging as the favoured presidential candidate of Sonia Gandhi. In February, the infamous Samjhauta Express bombings took place, killing Pakistani civilians in Panipat, Haryana. As of 2011, nobody had been charged for the crime, though it has been linked to Abhinav Bharat, a shadowy Hindu fundamentalist group headed by a former Indian army officer.

In 2008 October, India successfully launched its first mission to the Moon, the unmanned lunar probe called Chandrayaan-1. In the previous year, India had launched its first commercial space rocket, carrying an Italian satellite.

In November 2008, Mumbai attacks took place. India blamed militants from Pakistan for the attacks and announced a "pause" in the ongoing peace process.

In July 2009, the Delhi High Court decriminalised consensual homosexual sex, re-interpreting the British Raj-era law, Section 377 of the Indian Penal Code, as unconstitutional in regard to criminalising consensual sex between two homosexual adults or decriminalising such acts between adult heterosexuals or other consenting adults, that may be deemed unnatural.

In the Indian general election in 2009, the United Progressive Alliance won a convincing and resounding 262 seats, with Congress alone winning 206 seats. However, the Congress-led government faced many allegations of corruption. Inflation rose to an all-time high, and the ever-increasing prices of food commodities caused widespread agitation.

On 8 November 2009, in spite of strong protests by China, which claims the whole of Arunachal Pradesh as its own, the 14th Dalai Lama visited Tawang Monastery in Arunachal Pradesh,
which was a monumental event to the people of the region, and the abbot of the monastery greeted him with much fanfare and adulation.

21st-century India is facing the Naxalite–Maoist rebels, in the words of Prime Minister Manmohan Singh, India's "greatest internal security challenge", and other terrorist tensions (such as Islamist terrorist campaigns in and out of Jammu & Kashmir and terrorism in India's Northeast). Terrorism has increased in India, with bomb blasts in leading cities like Mumbai, New Delhi, Jaipur, Bangalore, and Hyderabad. In the new millennium, India improved relations with many countries and foreign unions including the United States, the European Union, Israel, and the People's Republic of China. The economy of India has grown at a very rapid pace. India was now being looked at as a potential superpower.

2010s

Congress rule continues

The concerns and controversies over the 2010 Commonwealth Games rocked the country in 2010, raising questions about the credibility of the government followed by the 2G spectrum case and Adarsh Housing Society scam. In mid-2011, Anna Hazare, a prominent social activist, staged a 12-day hunger strike in Delhi in protest at state corruption, after government proposals to tighten up anti-graft legislation fell short of his demands.

Despite all this, India showed great promise with a higher growth rate in gross domestic product. In January 2011, India assumed a nonpermanent seat in the United Nations Security Council for the 2011–12 term. In 2004, India had launched an application for a permanent seat on the UN Security Council, along with Brazil, Germany and Japan. In March, India overtook China to become the world's largest importer of arms.

The Telangana movement reached its peak in 2011–12, leading to formation of India's 29th state, Telangana, in June 2014.

The 2012 Delhi gang rape and murder case and subsequent protest by civil society resulted in changes in the laws related to rape and offences against women. In April 2013, the Saradha Group financial scandal was unearthed, caused by the collapse of a Ponzi scheme run by Saradha Group, a consortium of over 200 private companies in Eastern India, causing an estimated loss of INR 200–300 billion (US$4–6 billion) to over 1.7 million depositors. In December 2013, the Supreme Court of India overturned the Delhi High Court ruling on Sec 377, criminalising homosexual sex between consenting adults once again in the country.

In August 2010, cloudbursts and the ensuing flooding in the Ladakh region of North India resulted in the deaths of around 255 people, while affecting 9,000 people directly. In June 2013, a multi-day cloudburst in Uttarakhand and other north Indian states caused devastating floods and landslides, with more than 5,700 people "presumed dead." In September 2014, floods in the state of Jammu and Kashmir, following heavy rains due to monsoon season, killed around 277 people and brought extensive damage to property. A further 280 people died in the neighbouring Pakistani regions, particularly in Pakistani Punjab.

In August – September 2013, clashes between Hindus and Muslims in Muzaffarnagar, Uttar Pradesh, resulted in at least 62 deaths, injured 93, and left more than 50,000 displaced.

In November 2013, India launched its first interplanetary mission, the Mars Orbiter Mission, popularly known as Mangalyaan, to Mars and, was successful, so ISRO on 24 September 2014, became the fourth space agency to reach Mars, after the Soviet space program, NASA, and the European Space Agency. ISRO also became the first space agency and India the first country to reach Mars on its maiden attempt.

2014 – Return of Bharatiya Janata Party (BJP) Government
The Hindutva movement advocating Hindu nationalism originated in the 1920s and has remained a strong political force in India. The major party of the religious right since the 1950s had been the Bharatiya Jana Sangh. The Jana Sangh joined the Janata party in 1977 but when that party fell apart in a short period of three years, the erstwhile members of Jana Sangh in 1980 formed the Bharatiya Janata Party (BJP). The BJP grew its support base in the following decades and is now the most dominant political party in India. In September 2013 the Chief Minister of Gujarat, Narendra Modi, was named the BJP's candidate for prime minister ahead of the 2014 Lok Sabha election. Several BJP leaders initially expressed opposition to Modi's candidature, including BJP founding member L. K. Advani. Contrary to the strategies used by the party during previous elections, Modi played the dominant role in the BJP's presidential style election campaign. The 16th national general election, held in early 2014, saw a huge victory for the BJP led NDA; the alliance gained an absolute majority and formed a government under the premiership of Modi. The Modi government's sweeping mandate and popularity helped the BJP win several state assembly elections in India. The Modi government implemented several initiatives and campaigns to increase manufacturing and infrastructure – notably — Make in India, Digital India and the Swachh Bharat Mission.

The BJP government introduced the Citizenship Amendment Act in 2019, sparking widespread protests.

2020s 

In February 2020, riots broke out in Delhi. The Citizenship Amendment Act protests have been described as an instigating factor. Tensions escalated on the Indo-China border after aggressive skirmishes between Indian and Chinese troops beginning on 5 May 2020. The Rama Janmabhoomi temple construction officially started again after a Bhoomi Poojan ceremony on 5 August 2020. The trend of protests continued in 2020, with the 2020 Indian agriculture acts which sparked the Indian farmers' protest in August 2020.

On 25 July 2022, Droupadi Murmu was sworn in as India's new president, becoming India's first tribal president. Although largely ceremonial post, Murmu's election as tribal woman was historic.

India celebrated 75 years of its independence from the British Empire as a part of Azadi Ka Amrit Mahotsav on 15 August 2022.

COVID-19 pandemic 

The COVID-19 pandemic in India began on 30 January 2020, when the first case was reported in Thrissur. In September 2020, India's health minister Harsh Vardhan stated that the country planned to approve and begin distribution of a vaccine by the first quarter of 2021. Vaccination against COVID-19 started in India on 16 January 2021. By early April 2021, second wave of infections took hold in the country with destructive consequences. The second wave placed a major strain on the healthcare system, including shortage of liquid medical oxygen. The number of new cases had begun to steadily drop by late-May and vaccination gained momentum again. India administered 1 billion doses of COVID-19 vaccine on 21 October 2021.

See also
 Economic history of India
 Economy of India
 Military history of India
 Outline of ancient India
 Politics of India
 The Emergency (India)
 India (disambiguation)

References

Further reading
 Bipan Chandra, Mridula Mukherjee and Aditya Mukherjee. "India Since Independence"
 Bates, Crispin, and Subho Basu. The Politics of Modern India since Independence (Routledge/Edinburgh South Asian Studies Series) (2011)
 Brass, Paul R. The Politics of India since Independence (1980)
 
 
 
 
 Gopal, Sarvepalli. Jawaharlal Nehru: A Biography, Volume Two, 1947-1956 (1979); Jawaharlal Nehru: A Biography: 1956-64 Vol 3 (1985)
   excerpt and text search
 Guha, Ramachandra. Makers of Modern India (2011)  excerpt and text search
 
 
 McCartney, Matthew. India – The Political Economy of Growth, Stagnation and the State, 1951–2007 (2009); Political Economy, Growth and Liberalisation in India, 1991-2008 (2009)  excerpt and text search
 Mansingh, Surjit. The A to Z of India (The A to Z Guide Series) (2010)
 
 
 Saravanan, Velayutham. Environmental History of Modern India: Land, Population, Technology and Development (Bloomsbury Publishing India, 2022) online review
 Tomlinson, B.R. The Economy of Modern India 1860–1970 (1996) excerpt and text search
 Zachariah, Benjamin. Nehru (Routledge Historical Biographies) (2004)  excerpt and text search

Primary sources
 Appadorai A., ed. Select Documents on India's Foreign Policy and Relations (Delhi: Oxford University Press, 1982)

External links
 India country profile BBC India profile